Mesothen bisexualis is a species of moth in the subfamily Arctiinae. It is found in Colombia and Ecuador.

References

 Natural History Museum Lepidoptera generic names catalog

Mesothen (moth)
Moths described in 1912